The 2012 Stroud Council election was on 3 May 2012 to elect members of the Stroud District Council. Eighteen seats were up for grabs and the Conservative Party won nine.

Election result

Ward results

References

2012 English local elections
2012
2010s in Gloucestershire